"And Maggie Makes Three" is the thirteenth episode of the sixth season of the American animated television series The Simpsons. It originally aired on the Fox network in the United States on January 22, 1995. In the episode, Homer recounts the story of Maggie's birth when the kids ask why there are no photos of her in the family album.

The episode was written by Jennifer Crittenden and directed by Swinton O. Scott III. This was both Crittenden and Scott's first episode on The Simpsons. It features cultural references to television series such as The Mary Tyler Moore Show and Knight Rider. Since airing, the episode has received critical acclaim from fans and television critics. It acquired a Nielsen rating of 10.3, and was the fourth highest rated show on the Fox network the week it aired.

Plot
While browsing through the family photo album, Lisa notices it contains no baby pictures of Maggie. Homer explains why by recounting the story of Maggie's birth.

In 1993, Homer hated his job at the Springfield Nuclear Power Plant and dreamed of working at a bowling alley. After receiving a paycheck clearing him of all his debts, he quit his job at the power plant, humiliating Mr. Burns and (literally) burning a bridge during his departure. Homer was thrilled with his new job at Barney's Uncle Al's bowling alley.

When Homer and Marge "snuggled" to celebrate his new job, she became pregnant. Marge made Patty and Selma promise not to tell him, but they told two people known for gossiping. By the next day, the entire city of Springfield knew Marge was pregnant. Homer was blind to obvious signs, even when Moe congratulated him for getting Marge pregnant and her friends and family threw her a baby shower. When Maude casually congratulated him on his new job, Homer suddenly realized Marge was pregnant. The news upset him because he was happier working at the bowling alley than any other job.

Marge urged Homer to ask Al for a raise. Al explained the alley's profits prevented him from offering one unless Homer could find a way to increase business threefold. Homer tried to attract more customers by firing a shotgun outside the bowling alley, which only caused a massive panic and large police response. Unable to drum up business, Homer quit his dream job and returned to the power plant. Mr. Burns made Homer beg for his job back and placed a large plaque near his desk which read: "Don't forget: you're here forever". Homer was miserable at work again, but he instantly fell in love with Maggie when she was born.

Back in the present, Bart and Lisa still do not understand what this story has to do with Maggie's missing baby pictures. Homer says the photos are where he needs them most: all over the walls of his work area at the power plant. He has taped some of them to the plaque, covering portions so that it now reads "Do it for her."

Production
The episode was written by Jennifer Crittenden, and directed by Swinton O. Scott III. This was the first episode Scott directed for the show. Crittenden also made her debut as a writer for The Simpsons in this episode. Crittenden was taking a beginners' writing program at 20th Century Fox when former The Simpsons showrunner David Mirkin hired her on the show. Crittenden's only writing experience before that had been as an intern on the Late Show with David Letterman. 20th Century Fox introduced Crittenden to Mirkin, and Mirkin read a script of hers that he liked. When Mirkin first talked to Crittenden, he thought she was a really nice woman who was very mature. Crittenden was only 23 years old at the time, but Mirkin liked her, and he hired her.

After Homer quits his job at the power plant, he violently tosses his old boss Mr. Burns out of the cart he is driving. Homer then drives across a wooden bridge and tosses a match onto it; the whole bridge is instantly engulfed in flames. Mirkin came up with the joke, and said that "the thing with animation is that you can stage almost anything and time it perfectly, something you would not be able to do in live action". As a live-action director, Mirkin said he enjoys the amount of control they have in animation.

In the episode, Mr. Burns places a "de-motivational plaque" in Homer's station that reads "Don't forget: you're here forever". Homer then places photos of Maggie around the plaque to alter it into saying "Do it for her". The Simpsons writer George Meyer, who enjoys writing jokes that involve anagrams or any other forms of word play, came up with the idea for this particular joke. The joke is also an homage to Al Jaffee's Fold-in features in the Mad magazine.

On September 4, 2018, 23 years after the episode's original broadcast, Simpsons producer Matt Selman posted a tweet saying that he had noticed a continuity error in the episode. When Marge announces to Homer that she is pregnant with Maggie, a photo of the baby can be seen in the background. However, this photo could show a baby Lisa, wearing clothes that would later be passed on to the new baby, Maggie.

Cultural references
The couch gag is a reference to the James Bond gun barrel sequence. Dr. Hibbert's flashback hairstyle is modeled after Arsenio Hall's. The family watches Knight Boat, a parody of Knight Rider. Homer spinning around with a bowling ball in his hand before throwing it into the air and exclaiming "I'm gonna make it after all" is reminiscent of the opening of The Mary Tyler Moore Show where Mary throws her hat into the air.

Reception

Critical reception

Since airing, the episode has received critical acclaim from fans and television critics. One-time The Simpsons writer and comedian Ricky Gervais named it his second favorite episode, and said: "Mr. Burns gives [Homer] this terrible plaque above his desk that says, 'Don't forget: You're here forever.' It's about how sometimes things don't go the way you planned, which is pretty amazing in a cartoon. Homer then puts up all the pictures of Maggie he's ever taken to strategically cover this horrible thing so it now reads, 'Do it for her.' It gives me a lump in the throat thinking about it." Warren Martyn and Adrian Wood, the authors of the book I Can't Believe It's a Bigger and Better Updated Unofficial Simpsons Guide, said: "A surprisingly traditional episode. The flashback to 1993 seems a bit odd, but this is a good example of a story that doesn't overly rely on set pieces and confounded expectations for its success." In a review of the sixth season, Joshua Klein of the Chicago Tribune cited "And Maggie Makes Three", "Treehouse of Horror V", "Homer Badman", and "Lisa's Rival" among his favorite episodes of the season.

TV Squad's Adam Finley said the episode "manages to be both incredibly funny and incredibly touching, both signs of a great Simpsons episode". He added that "the episode has some great gags in it, but the emotion is very real, too. Homer is not thrilled with the idea of having a baby, and the episode does a wonderful job of showing the dark side of having another mouth to feed." Colin Jacobson at DVD Movie Guide said in a review of the sixth season DVD: "Flashback episodes of The Simpsons usually work well, and [this episode] is no exception to that rule. Actually, at this point it’s one of my favorites, but that’s partially because of overexposure to some of the other episodes. In any case, this one has many hilarious moments – such as the scene that explains Homer's hair loss." Kevin Wong at PopMatters said the episode is "a touching look at fatherhood".

Ratings
In its original broadcast, "And Maggie Makes Three" finished 47th in the ratings for the week of January 16 to January 22, 1995, with a Nielsen rating of 10.3. The episode was the fourth-highest rated show on the Fox network that week, beaten only by Melrose Place, Beverly Hills, 90210, and the Rock 'n' Roll Skating Championship.

References

External links

 

The Simpsons (season 6) episodes
1995 American television episodes
Pregnancy-themed television episodes